George Fitzroy Seymour (Witley 8 February 1923 - Thrumpton 12 May 1994) was High Sheriff of Nottinghamshire in 1966  and Deputy Lieutenant of Nottinghamshire.

Family

He was the son of Richard Sturgis Seymour and Lady Victoria Alexandrina Mabel FitzRoy. He was educated at Winchester College.

He married Hon. Rosemary Nest Scott-Ellis, daughter of Thomas Scott-Ellis, 8th Baron Howard de Walden  and  Margherita van Raalte, on 1 June 1946. This marriage produced two children
Miranda Jane Seymour (b. 8 Aug 1948)
Thomas Oliver Seymour (b. 20 Oct 1952)

Career

He spent much of his life working for the preservation of Thrumpton Hall, his home in Thrumpton, Nottinghamshire. He had moved here when he was one, in 1924. His diplomat father had been posted to La Paz in Bolivia and George's mother went too. Her brother-in-law was the 10th Lord Byron. Although he moved back to his family when they returned to London 18 months later, he spent his holidays here. At the age of 13, he was writing school essays about life as a squire - or a squarson.

He fought in the Second World War between 1941 and 1942, with the King's Royal Rifle Corps (60th Rifles), and was invalided.

After his uncle's death in 1949, with heavy death-duties Seymour was compelled to buy the house he had expected to inherit and, in a country auction, as many of its contents as he could afford. He borrowed £50,000, (equivalent to £ as of )  and by selling the majority of the estate, paid it back within the year.

He held the office of High Sheriff of Nottinghamshire for 1966–67. He was a Justice of the Peace for Nottinghamshire for over 30 years. He had been the longest-serving member on the Council of the Magistrates' Association and between 1975 and 1978 he served as chairman of the association's Juvenile Courts Committee. He also held the office of Deputy Lieutenant of Nottinghamshire.

He was a great supporter, benefactor and President of Thrumpton Village Cricket club from 1949. He was also a member of Nottinghamshire County Cricket Club and Marylebone Cricket Club, but the village club enjoyed much of his time amidst a wide variety of public duties. When the Thrumpton club lost its ground on Church Lane at the end of 1967, he offered the use of his park and since 1968 the ground has been one of the most picturesque in the County.

He is posthumously the subject of the book Thrumpton Hall: A Memoir of Life in My Father’s House written by his daughter, Miranda Seymour.

References

1923 births
1994 deaths
People educated at Winchester College
Deputy Lieutenants of Nottinghamshire
High Sheriffs of Nottinghamshire
People from Surrey
King's Royal Rifle Corps officers